The Road Home may refer to:

Film and television
 The Road Home (1996 film), an American film directed by Bo Svenson
 The Road Home (1999 film), a Chinese film directed by Zhang Yimou, featuring Zhang Ziyi in her film debut
 The Road Home (2003 film), an American film directed by Drew Johnson
 The Road Home (American TV series), a 1994 TV series starring Karen Allen
 The Road Home (South Korean TV series), a 2009 South Korean TV series starring Lee Sang-woo and Jang Shin-young
 "The Road Home" (Voltron: Legendary Defender), a 2018 episode

Music
 The Road Home (Heart album), 1995
 The Road Home (Jordan Rudess album), 2007
 "The Road Home", a song by Travis Tritt from Country Club

Other uses
 Road Home, a U.S. government program for hurricane disaster aid in Louisiana
 The Road Home (novel), a 2007 novel by Rose Tremain

See also
 The Road Back Home, a 2007 album by The Flower Kings
 The Road from Home, a 1979 children's book by David Kherdian
 The Long Road Home (disambiguation)
 Bruce Wayne: The Road Home, a 2010 Batman comic event